Goniatites crenistria is a species of extinct cephalopods belonging to the family Goniatitidae, included in the superfamily Goniatitaceae.

These fast-moving nektonic carnivores lived in the Carboniferous from 345.3 to 326.4 Ma.

References

 Miller, Furnish, and Schindewolf, 1957. Paleozoic Ammonoidea, Treatise on Invertebrate Paleontology, Part L. Geological Society of America.
 Museum of Victoria

Goniatitidae
Carboniferous ammonites of Europe
Carboniferous ammonites of North America
Fossil taxa described in 1836